Isaiah 48 is the forty-eighth chapter of the Book of Isaiah in the Hebrew Bible or the Old Testament of the Christian Bible. This book contains the prophecies attributed to the prophet Isaiah, and is one of the Books of the Prophets. Chapters 40-55 are known as "Deutero-Isaiah" and date from the time of the Israelites' exile in Babylon. According to John Skinner, this chapter, which is "largely a recapitulation of certain outstanding themes of the prophecy", consists of "exhortations addressed to the exiles in the near prospect of deliverance".

Text 
The original text was written in Hebrew language. This chapter is divided into 22 verses.

Textual witnesses
Some early manuscripts containing the text of this chapter in Hebrew are of the Masoretic Text tradition, which includes the Codex Cairensis (895), the Petersburg Codex of the Prophets (916), Aleppo Codex (10th century), Codex Leningradensis (1008).

Fragments containing parts of this chapter were found among the Dead Sea Scrolls (3rd century BC or later):
 1QIsaa: complete
 1QIsab: extant verses 17‑22
 4QIsac (4Q57): extant verses 10‑13, 17‑19
 4QIsad (4Q58): extant verses 8‑22

There is also a translation into Koine Greek known as the Septuagint, made in the last few centuries BCE. Extant ancient manuscripts of the Septuagint version include Codex Vaticanus (B; B; 4th century), Codex Sinaiticus (S; BHK: S; 4th century), Codex Alexandrinus (A; A; 5th century) and Codex Marchalianus (Q; Q; 6th century).

Parashot
The parashah sections listed here are based on the Aleppo Codex. Isaiah 48 is a part of the Consolations (Isaiah 40–66). {P}: open parashah; {S}: closed parashah.
 {S} 48:1-2 {S} 48:3-11 {P} 48:12-16 {P} 48:17-19 {S} 48:20-22 {P}

Israel's Stubbornness (48:1–11)

Verse 1

The community of Israel is accused of falsity in their commitment to YHWH and appears to be the cause of complaint in this passage.

Deliverance Promised to Israel {48:12–22)

Verses 20–21

A "closing hymn of praise".

See also

 Babylon
 Chaldean
 Israel
 Jacob
 Judah
Related Bible parts: Matthew 15, Matthew 23, 2 Timothy 3

References

Sources

External links

Jewish
Isaiah 48 Hebrew with Parallel English

Christian
Isaiah 48 English Translation with Parallel Latin Vulgate

48